Dishforth  is a village and civil parish in the Harrogate district of North Yorkshire, England. Dishforth translates from Old English as dic-ford; a ford by a dike or ditch. The population of the parish taken at the 2001 census as 719 and had risen to 905 by the time of the 2011 census.

It is just north of Dishforth Airfield, which up until April 2016 was an Army Air Corps helicopter station.  The village is close to the A1(M) and the A168.  The original route of the Great North Road runs through the village but RAF Dishforth was built over the old road which used to be the A1 and later the A167.  The closest town is Boroughbridge  to the south.

The village has two pubs adjacent to one another; the Black Swan and the Crown Inn.  The village has a small Methodist church, a village hall (which used to be the village church) and a primary school.

References

External links

Villages in North Yorkshire
Civil parishes in North Yorkshire